The 1933 South Dakota Coyotes football team was an American football team that represented the University of South Dakota in the North Central Conference (NCC) during the 1933 college football season. In its third and final season under head coach Stanley G. Backman, the team compiled a 5–6 record (1–3 against NCC opponents), tied for last place in the NCC, and was outscored by a total of 123 to 65. The team played its home games at Inman Field in Vermillion, South Dakota.

Schedule

References

South Dakota
South Dakota Coyotes football seasons
South Dakota Coyotes football